Ion plating (IP) is a physical vapor deposition (PVD) process that is sometimes called ion assisted deposition (IAD) or ion vapor deposition (IVD) and is a modified version of vacuum deposition. Ion plating uses concurrent or periodic bombardment of the substrate, and deposits film by atomic-sized energetic particles called ions. Bombardment prior to deposition is used to sputter clean the substrate surface. During deposition the bombardment is used to modify and control the properties of the depositing film. It is important that the bombardment be continuous between the cleaning and the deposition portions of the process to maintain an atomically clean interface.

Process
In ion plating, the energy, flux and mass of the bombarding species along with the ratio of bombarding particles to depositing particles are important processing variables. The depositing material may be vaporized either by evaporation, sputtering (bias sputtering), arc vaporization or by decomposition of a chemical vapor precursor chemical vapor deposition (CVD). The energetic particles used for bombardment are usually ions of an inert or reactive gas, or, in some cases, ions of the condensing film material ("film ions"). Ion plating can be done in a plasma environment where ions for bombardment are extracted from the plasma or it may be done in a vacuum environment where ions for bombardment are formed in a separate ion gun. The latter ion plating configuration is often called Ion Beam Assisted Deposition (IBAD). By using a reactive gas or vapor in the plasma, films of compound materials can be deposited.

Ion plating is used to deposit hard coatings of compound materials on tools, adherent metal coatings, optical coatings with high densities, and conformal coatings on complex surfaces.

Advantages
Better surface coverage than other methods (Physical vapor deposition, Sputter deposition).
More energy available on the surface of the bombarding species, resulting in more complete bonding.
Flexibility with the level of ion bombardment.
Improved chemical reactions when supplying plasma and energy to surface of the bombarding species.

Disadvantages
Increased variables to take into account when compared to other techniques.
Uniformity of plating not always consistent
Excessive heating to the substrate
Compressive stress

History
The ion plating process was first described in the technical literature by Donald M. Mattox of Sandia National Laboratories in 1964.

Further reading

See also
 List of coating techniques

References

External links

Chemical processes
Thin film deposition